The Steinlauihorn is a mountain of the Bernese Alps, overlooking Handegg in the Bernese Oberland. It lies south of the Ritzlihorn, on the range separating the valley of the Gauli Glacier from the main Aar valley.

References

External links
 Steinlauihorn on Hikr

Mountains of the Alps
Alpine three-thousanders
Mountains of Switzerland
Mountains of the canton of Bern